John Conway is an Australian palaeoartist and illustrator who specializes primarily in Mesozoic reptiles and pterosaurs in particular. His works include the 2012 book All Yesterdays in collaboration with C. M. Kosemen, Darren Naish and Scott Hartman.

References

Living people
Paleoartists
Australian illustrators
Year of birth missing (living people)